S-Fone was a mobile communication operator in Vietnam that used the CDMA technology. Founded on 1 July 2003 in Ho Chi Minh City, Vietnam, S-Fone became the third network of Vietnam, breaking the duopoly of the two VNPT operators. It is the trademark of S-Telecom (CDMA Mobile Phone Centre) (set up as a joint venture between Saigon Postel Corp. (SPT) and Korea SK Telecom). SK Telecom decided to leave the partnership in 2010. SPT has since then found it difficult to find a new partner, after a co-operation with Saigon Tel failed.

As of the start of 2005, breaking the old rule of the calls fee from 10 second to 1 second (6+1)7, S-Fone has 1,500,000 to 1,800,000 subscribers, contributing 3% to the total market (after Mobifone with 41%, Viettel Mobile with 34% and Vinaphone with 20%. Its market share (estimated based on revenues) fell to 0.1% by 2012 after suffering from a lack of capital, a small number of subscribers and low network quality.

S-Fone has become highly indebted and has been unable to pay salaries for several months in its Hanoi branch in late 2012. S-Fone ceased its operation, closed its stores and website, and released its staff from their contracts in July 2012. Its operating license expired in 2016.

Achievements
S-Fone is the first and biggest national cellular mobile phone network using CDMA in Vietnam (followed by EVN Telecom and HT Mobile). On 9 October 2006, S-Fone officially launched CDMA 2000 1x EV-DO value added services for the first time in Vietnam: VOD/MOD (Video, TV on demand, music on demand) and mobile Internet (enabling internet access for PCs and laptops via S-Fone network) beginning in Ho Chi Minh City, Hanoi, Da Nang, Hai Phong and Can Tho.

References

Telecommunications companies of Vietnam
Telecommunications companies established in 2003
2003 establishments in Vietnam
Vietnamese brands